Paradise and Back is a 1964 Danish family film directed by Gabriel Axel and starring Poul Reichhardt.

Cast 
 Poul Reichhardt – Tonnemann
 Lise Ringheim – the lady
 Nina Larsen - Mona – 11 years old
  - Mona – 16 years old
 Winnie Sørensen - Mona – 36 years old
 Henning Olsen - Tom – 11 years old
  - Tom – 16 years old
 Poul Clemmensen – Tom – 36 years old
 Kjeld Jacobsen – Børge
  - Sonja
 Preben Lerdorff Rye – actor
 Erik Paaske – Karl
 Guri Richter – Lilian
 Emil Halberg - guard
 Ove Rud – resistance fighter
 Kirsten Walther – Lajla
 Jakob Nielsen (actor) - Spritter
  - funfair owner
 Niels Skousen – Alex
 Knud Rasmussen
 Svend Johansen – officer
  - jew
 Aage Fønss – neighbor
 Einar Juhl – retired colonel

References

External links 
 
 Paradise and Back at the Danish National Filmography

1964 films
1960s Danish-language films
Films directed by Gabriel Axel
Danish black-and-white films